UCHealth Park (formerly known as Sky Sox Stadium from its opening until 2005 and as Security Service Field from then until 2019) is a professional baseball stadium on the eastern edge of Colorado Springs, Colorado. Since 2019, it has hosted the Rocky Mountain Vibes, an independent Minor League Baseball team of the Pioneer League. From 1988 to 2018, the stadium was the home of the Colorado Springs Sky Sox, a Triple-A team of the Pacific Coast League.

History
Before the completion of Sky Sox Stadium, the Sky Sox played at Spurgeon Stadium, a public field at Memorial Park in downtown Colorado Springs which had hosted the original Sky Sox. Sky Sox Stadium opened late for the 1988 season at a cost of $3.4 million and remained the home of the Sky Sox until their 2018 departure.

The Sky Sox won Pacific Coast League championships in 1992 and 1995, and attendance was generally good; however, at the end of the 2004 season, facing declining turnout and an assortment of problems that showed the ballpark's age (capped by the center-field scoreboard, on which the ball, strike, and out indicators were non-functional), team executives decided to renovate the ballpark.  Changes included an improved sound system, a more modern scoreboard with video screen, a new walkway leading to the gates, a banquet facility at the end of the right field concourse, and a readout in the right field wall displaying the speed of each pitch.

Along with these changes, the park's naming rights were sold to Security Service Federal Credit Union. The naming rights deal expired after the 2018 season, and on May 8, 2019, it was announced that UCHealth, as part of a sponsorship deal with the Vibes, had purchased the naming rights to the field, giving it its current UCHealth Park name.

The current attendance record was set on July 4, 2004 when the Sky Sox lost to the Omaha Royals 6–5 in front of 9,505 fans.

Trivia
The names of some of the great players in Sky Sox history ring the upper deck.  Known as the members of the Sky Sox Hall of Fame, they are Luis Medina (played 1988–1991), Sam Hairston (played 1950–1956), Charlie Manuel (managed 1990–1992), Alan Cockrell (played 1990, 1992, 1994–1996), Norm "Bulldog" Coleman (non-player who helped the Sky Sox succeed financially, inducted 1996), Ryan Hawblitzel (played 1993–1996), Trenidad Hubbard (played 1993–1996), and Brad Mills (managed 1993–1996). All historical players have their jerseys retired and statistics shown in the Hall of Fame Bar & Grill located within UCHealth Park.

UCHealth Park is 6,531 feet above sea level, making it the highest professional baseball park in North America. The stadium faces east, toward the plains and the Springs Ranch housing development, meaning that fans cannot see the Rocky Mountains to the west. This is due to the fact the sun sets over the mountains and would be a distraction to batters if the stadium faced west.

Covering most of the first base line is the Coors VIP Picnic Terrace. It holds nearly a thousand people and is the site of many weddings and other special occasions. At the end of the right field foul line, there is an 8-person hot tub that is recognized as "The Highest Hot Tub in Professional Sports". Guests are served champagne and acknowledged on the main display.

References

External links

Security Service Field | Vibes
Security Service Field – Ball Parks of the Minor Leagues | littleballparks.com

Sports venues in Colorado Springs, Colorado
Minor league baseball venues
Sports venues completed in 1988
1988 establishments in Colorado
Baseball venues in Colorado